Martin Raška (born 31 January 1977) is a Czech football goalkeeper who works as a goalkeeping coach at DAC Dunajská Streda.

Honours
Baník Ostrava

Gambrinus liga (1): 2003–04
Czech Cup (1): 2004–05

Zemplín Michalovce

2. Liga (1): 2014–15

External links

 FC Midtjylland profile
 

1977 births
Living people
Czech footballers
Czech Republic youth international footballers
Czech Republic under-21 international footballers
Czech First League players
FC Baník Ostrava players
FC Spartak Trnava players
MFK Zemplín Michalovce players
FC Midtjylland players
Danish Superliga players
Slovak Super Liga players
2. Liga (Slovakia) players
Czech expatriate footballers
Expatriate footballers in Slovakia
Czech expatriate sportspeople in Slovakia
Expatriate men's footballers in Denmark
Czech expatriate sportspeople in Denmark
Association football goalkeepers
Sportspeople from Ostrava